The National Assembly is the unicameral legislature of Kuwait. The National Assembly meets in Kuwait City. Political parties are illegal in Kuwait, candidates run as independents. The National Assembly is made up of 50 elected members and 16 appointed government ministers (ex officio members).

Overview
The National Assembly is the legislature in Kuwait, established in 1963. Its predecessor, the 1938 National Assembly was formally dissolved in 1939 after "one member, Sulaiman al-Adasani, in possession of a letter, signed by other Assembly members, addressed to Iraq's King Ghazi, requesting Kuwait's immediate incorporation into Iraq". This demand came after the merchant members of the Assembly attempted to extract oil money from Ahmad Al-Jaber Al-Sabah, a suggestion refused by him and upon which he instigated a crackdown which arrested the Assembly members in 1939.

The National Assembly can have up to 50 MPs. Fifty deputies are elected by one non-transferable vote to serve four-year terms. Members of the cabinet also sit in the parliament as deputies. The constitution limits the size of the cabinet to 16. The cabinet ministers have the same rights as the elected MPs, with the following two exceptions: they do not participate in the work of committees, and they cannot vote when an interpolation leads to a no-confidence vote against one of the cabinet members. In 2001, Nathan J. Brown claimed Kuwait's National Assembly is the most independent parliament in the Arab world; in 2009, Israeli scholar Eran Segal claimed it is among the "strongest" parliaments in the Middle East. As per Article 107 of the Kuwait constitution, the National Assembly can be dissolved by the Amir by decree, giving the reasons for the dissolution. However, the National Assembly shall not be dissolved again on the same grounds, and elections for the new Assembly must be held within a period not exceeding two months from the date of the dissolution.

Gender balance
Women gained the right to vote in 2005. No women candidates won seats in the 2006 and 2008 elections. Women first won seats in the National Assembly in the 2009 election, in which four women, Aseel al-Awadhi, Rola Dashti, Massouma al-Mubarak and Salwa al-Jassar, were elected.

Building

The parliament building was designed by Danish architect Jørn Utzon, who also designed Sydney Opera House.

Political factions
While political parties are not legally recognized in Kuwait, a number of political factions exist. The house is composed of different political factions in addition to independents:

 The liberal, secular bloc.
 The Shaabi (populist) bloc: A coalition of populists (Sunni and Shia), liberals and nationalist political organizations with a focus on middle-class issues. The Popular Action Bloc is their main political organization.
 The Islamist bloc: Consisting of Sunni Islamist members.

See also
 Politics of Kuwait
 Government of Kuwait
 Cabinet of Kuwait
 Elections in Kuwait
 List of Speakers of Kuwait National Assembly
 Kuwait National Assembly No-Confidence Votes

References

External links
Kuwait National Assembly website

1963 establishments in Kuwait
Kuwait
Government of Kuwait
Kuwait
Kuwait
National Assembly